The Mailapitiya National War Memorial in Mailapitiya, Kandy is dedicated to all military and police personal killed in the Sri Lankan Civil War. It is a memorial park, with memorial walls and visitor center.

References
Lest we forget – the Ranaviru

Sri Lankan military memorials and cemeteries
Buildings and structures in Kandy